Keith Andrew Fagg (born 30 September 1955) is an Australian businessman who served as the 94th Mayor of Geelong.

Fagg serves as a director of long-established family-run business, Fagg's Mitre 10 in Geelong. Samuel and William Fagg founded the firm in 1854, after migrating from Deal in England.

Fagg was elected for a four-year term as Mayor of Geelong in the 2012 mayoral election, winning with a significant primary vote of 43%, and was sworn in on 5 November 2012.

This was the first time the office was selected by means of a direct election, following changes introduced by the Victorian Government in 2012. Previous mayors of Geelong were elected by fellow members of the city council.

On 16 August 2013, Fagg announced his resignation from the position, citing unspecified health concerns. It was later reported that Fagg had been suffering from stress.

Prominent Geelong figure Frank Costa claimed that Fagg had been "bullied to the point of breakdown", however did not specify the source of the bullying. Reports of an "entrenched culture of bullying" in the City of Greater Geelong council have since come to light. Keith Fagg has stated that he agrees that a skilled investigator was needed to uncover the full extent of bullying within the council, rather than a mediator.

Keith Fagg currently writes a regular opinion piece for the Geelong Advertiser.

References

1955 births
Living people
Mayors of Geelong
People educated at Geelong College